The Council of Canadian Academies (CCA) (CAC) was created to perform independent, expert assessments of the science that is relevant to important public issues. The CCA's assessment scope includes the natural, social and health sciences, engineering and the humanities.

The CCA is a private, non-profit corporation that received a $30 million founding grant in 2005 from the Government of Canada.  The grant supported core operations for 10 years and was renewed twice, in 2015 with an additional $15 million for five years and in 2018 with an additional $9 million for three years starting in 2020–2021.

Although the CCA is at arm's length from government, it has agreed to conduct up to five assessments per year of subjects proposed by the Canadian federal government. The CCA can also perform assessments for non-governmental and private sector organizations, but the cost of these cannot be covered by the federal government's founding grant.

History 
A proposal for a formal structure for “Providing Independent Expert Advice to Government and the Public" was prepared by the Royal Society of Canada in 2000. This led to the incorporation of the Canadian Academies of Science in April 2002 by three founding member academies: The Royal Society of Canada, the Canadian Academy of Engineering, and the Canadian Institute of Academic Medicine (subsequently to evolve into the Canadian Academy of Health Sciences). Activities began in 2006 and in June 2006 the Canadian Academies of Science was renamed to Council of Canadian Academies. The first formal evaluation of the CCA by Innovation, Science, and Economic Development Canada took place in 2018.

Governance 
The CCA is governed by a 12-member Board of Directors, some of whom are appointed by the Canadian Academy of Health Sciences, the Canadian Academy of Engineering, and the Royal Society of Canada. Howard Alper served as first board chair. The current (interim) Chair is Sioban Nelson.

The CCA also has a Scientific Advisory Committee, whose role is to advise the Board on assessment topic selection, terms of reference, the selection of expert panelists, and peer review. The current (interim) Chair is David Castle.

Presidents 

 Peter J. Nicholson was appointment as the first President on February 8, 2006 and served to the end of 2009.
 Elizabeth Dowdeswell was president from April 2010 to September 2014.
 Janet Bax was interim President from October 2014 to January 31, 2016.
Eric M. Meslin is president as of February 1, 2016.

Assessments 
The CCA's assessments are performed by independent panels of qualified experts from Canada and abroad who serve pro bono. This model has been employed in other countries, most notably in the United States by the National Research Council of the US National Academies. All Council assessments are published and made available to the public free of charge in English and French. Assessments are published as panel consensus reports in conjunction with separate "Report in Focus" summaries.  The first Director of Assessments was Marc Saner. The current Director of Assessments is Tijs Creutzberg.

Reports 
The first report of the CCA, The State of Science and Technology in Canada, was released September 12, 2006. Since then, the CCA has published over 50 additional assessments.

In January 2023, the CCA published Fault Lines, a report prepared for Innovation, Science and Economic Development Canada (ISED) by the organization's Expert Panel on the Socioeconomic Impacts of Science and Health Misinformation. The report provides an analysis of the landscape of "misinformation" and "disinformation" during the COVID-19 pandemic in Canada, suggesting that the vaccine hesitancy experienced by 2.3 million Canadians led to at least 2,800 deaths and $300 million in hospital expenses. Funding for the report was provided by the Government of Canada.

References

External links 
 Council of Canadian Academies – official website
 The Royal Society of Canada
 Canadian Academy of Health Sciences
 Canadian Academy of Engineering

2002 establishments in Ontario
Scientific organizations based in Canada
Non-profit organizations based in Ottawa